Salle Mohamed V is an indoor sporting arena located in Casablanca, Morocco.  The capacity of the arena is 12,000 people.

See also
Stade Mohammed V

Indoor arenas in Morocco
S